The Exiles is a 1923 American adventure film directed by Edmund Mortimer and written by Frederick J. Jackson and John Russell. It is based on the 1894 novel The Exiles by Richard Harding Davis. The film stars John Gilbert, Betty Bouton, John Webb Dillion, Margaret Fielding and Fred Warren. The film was released on October 14, 1923, by Fox Film Corporation.

In the film, a female murder suspect flees to Algiers, where she joins other self-exiled Americans. The prosecuting attorney follows her all the way to North Africa, and kidnaps her.

Plot
As described in a film magazine review, a man is shot in his office. Alice Carroll is arrested and charged with the murder. She escapes and goes to Algiers, where she stays at a notorious gambling resort in the company of fugitives known as "The Exiles." Henry Holcombe, the prosecuting attorney, discovers that Alice is innocent. He follows her to North Africa. When she refuses to return to the United States, Henry kidnaps her. They fall in love and she becomes his wife.

Cast           
John Gilbert as Henry Holcombe
Betty Bouton as Alice Carroll
John Webb Dillion as Wilhelm von Linke 
Margaret Fielding as Rose Ainsmith
Fred Warren as Dr. Randolph

References

External links
 

1923 films
American adventure films
1923 adventure films
Fox Film films
Films directed by Edmund Mortimer
American silent feature films
American black-and-white films
1920s English-language films
1920s American films
Films with screenplays by John Russell (screenwriter)
Films based on American novels
Films set in Algiers
Films about kidnapping
Silent adventure films